Ochraethes sommeri is a species of beetle in the family Cerambycidae. It was described by Chevrolat in 1835.

References

Ochraethes
Beetles described in 1835